Klata may refer to:
 Klata language, Austronesian language of the Philippines
 Klata (surname)

See also